Nadiya Mykolaïvna Myronyuk (born March 25, 1984 in Volyn Oblast) is a Ukrainian weightlifter.

Career
Myronyuk represented Ukraine at the 2008 Summer Olympics in Beijing, where she competed for the women's heavyweight category (75 kg). Myronyuk placed ninth in this event, as she successfully lifted 105 kg in the single-motion snatch, and hoisted 132 kg in the two-part, shoulder-to-overhead clean and jerk, for a total of 237 kg.

References

External links
NBC 2008 Olympics profile

Ukrainian female weightlifters
1984 births
Living people
Olympic weightlifters of Ukraine
Weightlifters at the 2008 Summer Olympics
Sportspeople from Volyn Oblast
21st-century Ukrainian women